Arlington is a neighborhood on the North Shore of Staten Island in New York City. It is a subsection of the Mariners' Harbor neighborhood, located north of the North Shore Branch, and west of Harbor Road. Arlington was given its name by Civil War veteran and resident Moses Henry Leman, in recognition of Arlington National Cemetery.

Arlington is the location of the Arlington Terrace Apartments on Holland Avenue.

Transportation
Until March 31, 1953, Arlington was served by the Arlington station of the Staten Island Railway. Arlington is served by the  local bus routes (and their rush-hour-only limited-stop counterparts, which are  respectively).

Education

Arlington residents are generally zoned for P.S. 44 (in Mariners' Harbor) and I.S. 72 in Heartland Village. Nearby schools also include P.S. 22 and I.S. 51. The local high school is Port Richmond High School.

A branch of the New York Public Library is planned for the community, to be located at 206 South Avenue. It is scheduled for completion in 2011.

Demographics
Arlington consists of the census tract 319.02. As of the 2010 census, the demographics were 54% Black or African American, 9% Nonhispanic White, 2% Asian, and 2% Multiracial. Hispanics of any race made up 31% of the population.

According to City-data, the median household income in Arlington was $36,577 in 2009. 25.7% of the population lives below the poverty line, making it one of the poorer communities in Staten Island, though a more working-class area compared to the rest of the city.

Notable residents
Debi Rose, New York City Councilwoman.

References

Neighborhoods in Staten Island